Kedushah (Holiness) is the name of several prayers recited during Jewish prayer services. These verses come from prophetic visions in which angels sing the verses, "Holy, Holy, Holy" as praises to God.

There exist several variations of the Kedushah, which appear in different contexts and have different laws. The best-known Kedushah is recited in the Amidah. Another is recited in the Yotzer ohr blessing, and a third (known as Kedushah d'sidra) is recited on various occasions including the conclusion of weekday Shacharit. In some versions of the kedushah, additional Biblical verses are added in the same format as the verses from Isaiah and Ezekiel.

Kedushah in the Amidah 

The Kedushah is traditionally the third section of all Amidah recitations. In the silent Amidah it is a short prayer, but in the repetition, which requires a minyan, it is considerably lengthier.  The recitation of Kedushah on a daily basis is a Babylonian custom; in classical Israel, the repetition of the Amidah would usually not include Kedushah, with Kedushah added only on special occasions. The liturgy varies among different communities and during different services, but they all hold in common three Bible verses (though translations vary):

Kadosh Kadosh Kadosh Adonai Tz'vaot M'lo Khol Ha'aretz K'vodo
"Holy, Holy, Holy, The Lord of Hosts, The entire world is filled with His Glory." 

Baruch K'vod Adonai Mim'komo
"Blessed is the Glory of the Lord in Its Place" 

Yimloch Adonai L'Olam, Elohayich Tziyon L'dor Vador Hall'luyah
"The Lord shall reign forever, Your God, O Zion, from generation to generation, Hallelujah" 

All three of the verses cited above are recited as part of the congregational response to the cantor. For the first verse, it is traditional for everyone to rise to their toes with each recitation of the word   ('holy').

In the Mussaf services of Shabbat and Festivals, and in some communities in the morning service as well, an enhanced version of the Kedushah is recited, with additional praises in between the biblical verses. In the Mussaf service of Shabbat and Festivals, a fourth verse is added as well: the opening line of the Shema. The opening line of the Shema is included as well in the Kedushah on Ne'ilah on Yom Kippur, and in the Ashkenazic rite (including the Chasidic rite) in all of the Kedushahs of Yom Kippur. Many sources describe the recitation of the Shema in Mussaf as a response to a historical anti-Jewish decree which prohibited reciting Shema at the proper point of the service, but contemporary scholars have proposed a variety of other explanations as well.

During the Kedushah of the Amidah, prayer participants are expected to stand.

Kedushah is recited whenever the Amidah is repeated - that is to say, in Shacharit, Mincha, Mussaf, and Ne'ilah, but not Maariv.

Kedushah in Yotzer Ohr 
A second Kedushah is recited as part of the Yotzer ohr blessing, before the Shema. The only two verses recited here are Isaiah 6:3 and Ezekiel 3:12.

Early sources dispute whether this kedushah may be recited by individuals praying without a minyan. The Shulchan Aruch records this dispute, and permits individuals to recite it even alone, but recommends that they recite it in the Torah reading chant, so that it is akin to Torah study rather than a kedushah recitation. The Rema, recording Ashkenazi practice, permits individuals to recite the kedushah without the Shulchan Aruch's recommendation.

Kedushah d'sidra 
There is also a text called the Kedushah D'Sidra which is recited at the conclusion of weekday morning services, at the beginning of the afternoon services of Shabbat and Festivals, the conclusion of the evening service of Saturday night, and (in the Ashkenazic rite) at the beginning of the Ne'ilah service at the end of Yom Kippur. 

This Kedushah contains three verses. The first two are the usual Isaiah 6:3 and Ezekiel 3:12. After each Biblical verse is recited in Hebrew, its Aramaic translation (Targum) is recited. This Kedushah does not require a minyan.

Sources and history 
Kedushah is mentioned in several sources from the Talmudic period. The earliest source is the Tosefta, which says:
Rabbi Yehudah would answer with the blesser: 'Holy, holy, holy is the Lord of Hosts; the entire world is full of His honor' and 'Blessed is the honor of the Lord from His place'. The Talmud states that the Great Assembly established "blessings, prayers, kedushot, and havdalot", but Rashi argues that the word "kedushot" here refers to kiddush rather than to Kedushah. Hekhalot Rabbati describes the angels praising God using the verses Isaiah 6:3, Ezekiel 3:12, Psalms 146:10; and the Jewish people reciting the verses "in Shacharit and Mincha". Similarly, the Talmud describes the angels reciting Isaiah 6:3 and Ezekiel 3:12, and Jews reciting at least the first of those verses:
Three groups of ministering angels say song each day; one says 'Holy', one says 'Holy', one says 'Holy is the Lord of hosts'. ... The ministering angels do not say song above until Israel says it below ... But there is [also the verse] 'Blessed'! - It is [a different group of angels, the] ofanim, who say [that verse]...

The accepted custom was to recite Kedushah in every Shacharit and Mincha Amidah repetition. However, Jews of the Land of Israel in this period only recited the Kedushah of the Amidah on special days - either Shabbat, or on any day Mussaf is recited as well as Hanukkah. Similarly, they recited the Kedushah of Yotzer Ohr only on such special occasions, and some communities may not have recited it at all.

In other religions 
The first Biblical verse in the Kedushah, Isaiah 6:3, is also found in the Sanctus of some Christian liturgical ordinaries.

References

External links 
  My Jewish Learning: Kedushah

Jewish prayer and ritual texts
Hebrew words and phrases in Jewish prayers and blessings
Siddur of Orthodox Judaism